The 2023 Asian Wrestling Championships is the 36th edition of Asian Wrestling Championships of combined events, and will take place from 9 to 14 April in Astana, Kazakhstan. The event was previously scheduled to be held in New Delhi, India.

Participation
  (30)

Medal overview

Medal Table

Medal Summery

Men's freestyle

Men's Greco-Roman

Women's freestyle

Team Ranking

References

External links
UWW Official Website

Asia
Asian Wrestling Championships
Asian Wrestling Championships
International wrestling competitions hosted by Kazakhstan
Sport in Astana
Asian Wrestling Championships
Wrestling